Lala Rukh (1948 – 2017), was a prominent Pakistani teacher, women's rights activist and artist who was known as founder of Women's Action Forum.

Education and Career
Rukh did Masters in Fine Arts at University of the Punjab, Lahore, Pakistan and University of Chicago, USA. She taught at Punjab University, Department of Fine Art for thirty years and at the National College of Arts, Lahore where, in 2000, she started MA (Hons) Visual Art Program. She was awarded various government travel grants in Pakistan to study in Turkey and Afghanistan.

Art Work
Rukh's art work has minimalist and meditative expressions. Her work, "Mirror Image, 1, 2, 3, 1997" (a collage) were acquired by Metropolitan Museum of Art, New York City in January, 2020. Editions of her work, "Rupak, 2016" (the digital animation) now belong in Tate Modern (London), Samdani Art Foundation (Bangladesh), Art Jameel Collection (Dubai) and The Metropolitan Museum of Art (New York City).

She was founder of All Pakistan Music Conference (1959), Vasl artists trust (2000), and Grey Noise gallery.

In 2017, Rukh's works were exhibited in Kassel, Germany in contemporary art exhibition documenta 14. Her works have also been exhibited in China, Athens Conservatoire, Greece in 2017, at Kunsthaus Centre D’Art Pasquart, Switzerland in 2017, at Centre Pompidou, France in 2018, at Punta della Dogana, Venice in 2019 and in three cities of England.

Feminist activist
Rukh was founding member of Women’s Action Forum (WAF). She was among fifteen members who founded WAF in 1981. As an activist and campaigner, she spoke for the rights of women and many minorities and women. She also took part in the women’s protest against martial law of Dictator Ziaul Haq. For her political activities, she was also sent to jail at that time. She was against the implementation of the Hudood Ordinance penal code considering it as discriminatory against women. Again during the Musharaf's dictatorship, when Emergency 2007 was imposed, she got arrested with other 50 WAF members. 
  
Rukh as active member of WAF, used her art to highlight community, women’s  rights  and  issues. In Lahore, when local printers on the orders of government refused to print the newsletters and protest material. Rukh began producing, designing and printing many of the WAF’s posters that were demanding freedom and equal rights for women. Her collection of feminist art "Crimes Against Women" originates from this group of posters.

She was also part of the "Pakistan-India Peoples' Forum for Peace and Democracy (PIPFPD)".

Rukh never married and adopted her sister’s daughter Mariam. Rukh was diagnosed with cancer in June 2017 and died on 7 July 2017 (69 years age).

References

1948 births
Pakistani women's rights activists
People from Lahore
20th-century Pakistani artists
Pakistani women artists
National College of Arts
2017 deaths
Pakistani women activists
Pakistani feminists